Michael Webster Bevan  (born 5 June 1952) is a professor at the John Innes Centre, Norwich, UK.

Education
Bevan was educated at the University of Auckland where he was awarded a Bachelor of Science in 1973 and a Master of Science in 1974. He went on to study at Corpus Christi College, Cambridge, where he was awarded a PhD in 1979 for work on differentiation in plant tissue cultures.

Research and career
Following his PhD, Bevan did postdoctoral research with Mary-Dell Chilton at Washington University in St. Louis where he identified ways to make functional chimaeric genes based on knowledge of gene function.

Bevan returned to the UK at the Plant Breeding Institute, Cambridge in 1980, part of the Agricultural and Food Research Council (AFRC). This became the John Innes Centre of the Biotechnology and Biological Sciences Research Council (BBSRC) where he has worked since 1988.

As of 2014, Bevan's laboratory focus on the molecular control of plant growth.

Awards and honours
Bevan was elected a Fellow of the Royal Society (FRS) in 2013. His nomination reads: 

He was appointed Officer of the Order of the British Empire (OBE) in the 2019 Birthday Honours for services to plant genomics.

References

1952 births
Living people
University of Auckland alumni
Alumni of Corpus Christi College, Cambridge
Academics of the University of East Anglia
New Zealand Fellows of the Royal Society
Members of the European Molecular Biology Organization
New Zealand scientists
Officers of the Order of the British Empire
Washington University in St. Louis fellows